The Svecoman movement was a Suecophile or pro-Swedish nationalist movement that arose in the Grand Duchy of Finland at the end of the 19th century chiefly as a reaction to the demands for increased use of Finnish vigorously presented by the Fennoman movement. The Fennoman nationalist movement had demanded that Swedish be replaced by Finnish in public administration, courts, and schools. At the time, Finnish and Swedish were spoken by about 85 and 15 percent respectively of the duchy's population.

The ideas of the "Svecomans" were an important part of the public debate of the 1870s and 1880s that was evoked by the reinstatement of the Diet of Finland, which now convened every third year.

History 

Finland had been a part of Sweden from the early Middle Ages until the Finnish War of 1808–1809, when it was ceded to Russia and made a Grand Duchy within the Russian Empire. Although Finnish was the language of the majority of the new Grand Duchy, a significant minority was Swedish-speaking. Swedish had been the language of administration and in educational institutions when Finland was part of the Swedish realm.

The Svecomans promoted the idea that Finland harbours two peoples, or nations, speaking different languages, with different cultures, and originating from separate parts of the country. In accordance with contemporary science, these two peoples were consequently denoted as members of different "races". This idea was radically new. Until then, the Swedish-speaking rural population had been mostly ignored, but now this minority was considered important and directly associated with the elite of Finland.

The language strife between Fennomans and Svecomans in these decades also mirrored more general political divisions:
 The Fennomans were favoured by the Russian authorities, while the Svecomans channeled the remaining fear of the Russians and the cultural attachment to their old enemy Sweden.
 After the Crimean War, when the Swedish-speaking towns on Finland's south coast and the merchant fleet had been severely damaged, neutralist views received strong support among educated Eastern-Swedish.
 The Fennomans were chiefly dominated by the clergy, the Svecomans by industrialists and academics from other faculties besides the theological one. The spiritual leader of the Svecomans was the linguist Axel Olof Freudenthal, who also had claims of racial supremacy.

The feeling of unity between the Swedish-speaking rural population and the (remains of the) Swedish-speaking elite is the lasting legacy of the Svecoman movement, and this became the core idea of the Swedish People's Party, which was founded after the introduction of equal and common suffrage in 1906.

See also 
Ethnogenesis 
Language strife 
Nation-building
Suecophile

References 

Swedish-speaking population of Finland
Finnish nationalism
Swedish nationalism